Jefferson Starship is an American hard rock band from San Francisco, California that developed in January 1974 as a successor to Jefferson Airplane.

History
The group initially featured the five remaining members of Jefferson Airplane, Grace Slick (vocals, piano), Paul Kantner (rhythm guitar, vocals), David Freiberg (bass, keyboards, vocals), Papa John Creach (violin), and John Barbata (drums, vocals); in addition to new members Craig Chaquico on lead guitar and Peter Kaukonen (brother of Jorma Kaukonen) on bass. The name "Jefferson Starship" was originally used on the co-billing of the 1970 Paul Kantner album, Blows Against the Empire, and was selected as the name for the revised band. After the band's first tour, Kaukonen was replaced by Pete Sears (bass, keyboards) in June 1974. Former Airplane vocalist Marty Balin joined the band in January 1975, having co-written and performed on the song "Caroline". Creach left in August 1975 to start a solo career. The band's lineup remained stable until June 1978, when Slick left the band after being asked to resign by Kantner, following a show in Germany in which she drank excessively and abused the crowd. Balin also departed the band after the end of the touring cycle for Earth. Additionally, Barbata dropped out after he was seriously injured in a car accident which left him unable to perform.

The remaining members of Jefferson Starship rebuilt the band in early 1979, adding drummer Aynsley Dunbar in January and vocalist Mickey Thomas in April. Slick returned to the band in 1981, after performing guest backing vocals on Modern Times. Dunbar was asked by Kantner to leave in 1982, with Donny Baldwin taking his place in September. Shortly after the band released Nuclear Furniture, Kantner left Jefferson Starship and later sued the remaining members of the band in October 1984 over ownership of the name; the lawsuit was settled in March 1985, with the name Jefferson Starship retired and the remaining band members continuing as simply Starship.

In January 1992, Kantner reformed Jefferson Starship with former KBC Band bandmates Mark "Slick" Aguilar (lead guitar) and Tim Gorman (keyboards, vocals), former Jefferson Airplane bandmate Jack Casady (bass) and Jefferson Starship bandmate Creach, and new members Darby Gould (vocals) and Prairie Prince (drums). Diana Mangano joined the following October and initially shared vocal duties, before becoming an official member of the band when Gould departed in 1995. Balin also rejoined the band in 1993. Creach died on February 22, 1994. Kaukonen returned briefly in 1994, and Gorman left around the same time; he was replaced first by Barry Flast, then by Gary Cambra, and finally by Terry "T" Lavitz. Chris Smith took over on keyboards in 1998. Casady left in 2000 and was replaced until 2004 by Tom Lilly.

Jefferson Starship returned with new studio album Jefferson's Tree of Liberty in 2008, which was the first by the band to feature vocalist Cathy Richardson, who had recently replaced Mangano, and the first since 1984's Nuclear Furniture to feature returning frontman Freiberg, who replaced Balin. Baldwin returned to the band after the album's release, replacing the departing Prince. In September 2012, Jude Gold took over from Aguilar who was forced to cease activity with the band after being diagnosed with hepatitis C. Richardson briefly left in November 2015, with Rachel Rose taking her place, before returning in March the following year. On January 28, 2016, Kantner, the only constant member of Jefferson Airplane and Jefferson Starship, died of multiple organ failure and septic shock following a heart attack a few days earlier. Since 2016, the lineup consists of Freiberg (vocals and rhythm guitar), Donny Baldwin (drums and backing vocals), Chris Smith (bass and keyboards), Cathy Richardson (vocals and guitar), and Jude Gold (lead guitar and backing vocals).

Members

Current

Former

Touring

Timeline

Lineups

See also
List of Jefferson Airplane members
List of Starship members

References

Bibliography

External links
Jefferson Starship official website

Jefferson Starship